Jeffrey R. Kerr-Ritchie (born 1960), is a British historian and professor at Howard University in Washington, D.C.

Education 
Born in London, Kerr-Ritchie was educated at Kingston University in England, and the University of Pennsylvania in Philadelphia, United States.

Career 
He has taught at Wesleyan University, University of Pennsylvania, Columbia University, Binghamton University, and the University of North Carolina at Greensboro]]. He has been at Howard University since 2006.

Awards 
Kerr-Ritchie  has been a Fellow at Fulbright-Hays UK, the Schomburg Center in New York, and the National Humanities Center in North Carolina.

Publications 
His first book, Freedpeople in the Tobacco South, Virginia 1860-1900, expands the traditional periodization of US Reconstruction to argue for the making of a black peasantry as a consequence of transformations in the global tobacco economy. His second, Rites of August First: Emancipation Day in the Black Atlantic World, examines commemorations of British colonial abolition and how these served as sites of anti-US slavery mobilization in the English-speaking Atlantic between the 1830s and 1860s.  The third, Freedom’s Seekers: Essays on Comparative Emancipation, offers a broad transnational focus of experiences and lives challenging nation-centered histories that usually end up reifying exceptional narratives of emancipation. One “of the most informative and important books focusing on emancipations and the Atlantic world published in the last two decades,” concludes one reviewer. The fourth book, Rebellious Passage: The Creole Revolt and America’s Coastal Slave Trade, provides the first scholarly examination of the US maritime slave trade and a successful slave ship revolt in 1841 with international ramifications. One reviewer describes it as the “definitive book on the revolt and a model for transatlantic scholarship in the age of abolition.”

Books 
 Kerr-Ritchie, Jeffery R.,  Freedpeople in the Tobacco South, Virginia 1860-1900. Baton Rouge, Louisiana State University Press, 1999, 
 Kerr-Ritchie, Jeffery R., Rites of August First: Emancipation Day in the Black Atlantic World. Baton Rouge, Louisiana State University Press, 2007, 
 Kerr-Ritchie, Jeffery R., Freedom’s Seekers: Essays on Comparative Emancipation. Baton Rouge, Louisiana State University Press, 2014. 
 Kerr-Ritchie, Jeffery R., Rebellious Passage: The Creole Revolt and America’s Coastal Slave Trade. New York: Cambridge University Press, 2019.

Personal life 
Kerr-Ritchie is married to Elizabeth Lindquist;  they have two children, and live in Durham, North Carolina

References 

 
 Howard University Faculty Page

1960 births
20th-century British historians
21st-century British historians
20th-century British male writers
21st-century male writers
Black British writers
Historians of slavery
Alumni of Kingston University
British expatriate academics in the United States
University of Pennsylvania faculty
University of Pennsylvania alumni
Howard University faculty
Wesleyan University faculty
Columbia University faculty
University of North Carolina at Greensboro faculty
Binghamton University faculty
Writers from London
Living people